The Museum of Islamic Art is located in the Pergamon Museum and is part of the Staatliche Museen zu Berlin.

Collection 
The museum exhibits diverse works of Islamic art from the 7th century to 19th century from the area between Spain and India. Excavation activity in Ctesiphon, Samarra and Tabgha, as well as acquisition opportunities, led to Egypt, the Foreign Orient and Iran in particular being important focal points. Other regions are represented by important collection objects or groups, such as the calligraphy and miniature painting from the Mughal Empire or the sicilian ivory works of art.

Important objects of the collection 
Because of their size, art historical significance, or popularity with museum visitors, the most notable are:
 Mshatta Facade
 The Aleppo Room is the wall paneling from a broker's home in Aleppo, Syria, that was commissioned during the Ottoman Period. 
 Dome from the Alhambra
 Mihrab from Kashan
 Mihrab from Konya
 Dragon-Phoenix carpet, Asia Minor, early 15th century.
 Koran-folding desk, Asia Minor (Konya), 13th century
 Book art (changing exhibition in the book art cabinets).

In addition to the permanent exhibition, the museum also shows exhibitions of modern art from the Islamic world, in 2008, for example, "Turkish Delight" (contemporary Turkish design) and "Naqsh" (gender and role models in Iran).

In 2009, the museum received on permanent loan a collection of Islamic art from the London collector Edmund de Unger (1918–2011), the so-called "Keir Collection", formerly housed in his home in Ham, Surrey. The collection, assembled over more than 50 years, comprises some 1,500 works of art spanning 2,000 years and is one of the largest private collections of Islamic art. More than one hundred exhibits from the Keir Collection were first shown in 2007/2008 in the special exhibition Sammlerglück. Islamic Art from the Edmund de Unger Collection presented to the public at the Pergamon Museum. Another special exhibition with parts of this loan took place from March 2010 as part of the permanent exhibition of the Museum of Islamic Art entitled Sammlerglück. Masterpieces of Islamic Art from the Keir Collection. In July 2012, the cooperation between the National Museums in Berlin-Prussian Cultural Heritage and the owners of the Edmund de Unger Collection was terminated and the collection, originally intended as a long-term loan, was withdrawn. The reasons given were differing ideas on how to continue working with the collection.

History 

The museum was founded in 1904 by Wilhelm von Bode as the Islamic Department in the Kaiser-Friedrich-Museum (today's Bode-Museum) and initially established by Friedrich Sarre as honorary director. The occasion was the donation of the Mshatta facade, which originates from an unfinished umayyad desert palace located south of Amman by the Ottoman Sultan Abdülhamid II to Emperor Wilhelm II. Parts of the eastern portion of the facade and the ruins of the structure of which it formed a part remain in Jordan. Together with 21 carpets donated by Bode, the facade formed the basis of the collection. In the newly built Pergamon Museum, the museum moved into the upper floor of the south wing and was opened there in 1932. Because of II. World War, the exhibition was closed in 1939.

Despite the removal of artworks and the securing of objects remaining in the Pergamon Museum, the collection suffered damage and losses. A bomb hit destroyed one of the gate towers of the Mshatta façade, and an incendiary bomb burned all or part of valuable carpets housed in a vault at the Mint. In 1954 the collection was reopened as the Islamic Museum in the Pergamon Museum. The holdings that had been removed to the western occupation zones were returned to the museum in Dahlem, where they were also reexhibited in 1954 for the first time after the war. From 1968 to 1970, there was an exhibition in Charlottenburg Palace. In 1971, the permanent exhibition of the Museum of Islamic Art was opened in a new building in the Dahlem museum complex.

In 1958, the Islamic Museum in the Pergamon Museum on the Museumsinsel received back most of the artworks transferred to the Soviet Union from 1945 to 1946 as looted art. With the restoration of other important collection objects, it became possible to open all exhibition rooms to the public by 1967. Based on the Unification Treaty, the two museums were organizationally merged in 1992 under the name Museum of Islamic Art. At the Dahlem site, the exhibition closed in 1998. A newly designed permanent exhibition was opened on the upper floor of the south wing in the Pergamon Museum in 2000.

Directors 
The history of the collection was significantly shaped by the respective heads and directors, who thus simultaneously influenced the development of Islamic art history in Germany.

Exhibitions

Permanent exhibitions 
 since 2000: Islamic Cultures
 since 2016: transcultural relations, global biographies – Islamic art?

Special exhibitions 

2013

 Samarra – Center of the World.
 Masterpieces from the Seraglio paintings from the adhesive albums of Heinrich Friedrich von Diez
 Affordable to many. Printed fabrics from Egyptian tombs.
 Ornament and tongue: book bindings from the Islamic world.

2014

 Indulgence and Intoxication. Wine, tobacco and drugs in Indian paintings.
 Pride and Passion. Representations of men in the Mughal period.
 Mshatta in Focus. The Jordanian desert castle in historical photographs.

2015

 Picnic in the Park. Gardens in Islamic Miniature Painting
 Aatifi – News from Afghanistan.
 How Islamic Art Came to Berlin. The collector and museum director Friedrich Sarre

2016

 Mystical Travelers: Sufis, ascetics, and holy men.
 Reading words – feeling words An introduction to the Koran in Berlin collections.
 Contrast Syria. Photographs by Mohamad Al Roumi
 The Legacy of the Ancient Kings. Ctesiphon and the Persian sources of Islamic art.

2017

 Iran. Dawn of Modernity.
 Faithful wonder – Biblical traditions in the Islamic world.
 Cozy: rugs in Indian miniature paintings.

2018

 Perched | Stopover. An Installation by Felekşan Onar.
 Copy and Mastery.
 The Gallery in the Book. Islamic scrapbooks
 Tape Art
 With a sense of proportion. Masterpieces of architecture in Yemen

Research and outreach projects

Exhibition placement 
 Fellowship International Museum of the Federal Cultural Foundation.
 Objects of Transfer
 Cultural Stories from the Museum of Islamic Arts
 Multaka: Treffpunkt Museum – Refugees as Guides in Berlin Museums

Research abroad 
 Areia Antiqua. Ancient Herat / 3 projects
 Creation of digital cultural property registers for Syria
 Iran: The Provincial Museum Yazd / National Museum Tehran
 Qasr al-Mschatta: The Early Islamic Desert Castle of Mschatta, Jordan
 Reconstruction of an ancient cultural landscape in Baluchistan, Pakistan
 The Citadel of Aleppo, Syria

Cultural and political education 
 Prevention of extremism and development of museum educational access for Muslim multipliers.
 Common past – common future
 TAMAM – The educational project of mosque communities with the Museum of Islamic Art

Collection-related research 
 Khurasan – Land of the Sunrise
 Ctesiphon
 Samarra and the art of the Abbasids
 The Yousef Jameel Digitization Project

Bibliography 
 
 
 
 Jens Kröger: Das Berliner Museum für Islamische Kunst als Forschungsinstitution der Islamischen Kunst im 20. Jahrhundert. (PDF; 692 kB). In: XXX. Deutscher Orientalistentag, Freiburg, 24.–28. September 2007. Ausgewählte Vorträge, herausgegeben im Auftrag der DMG von Rainer Brunner, Jens Peter Laut und Maurus Reinkowski. 2009. 
 Stefan Weber: Zwischen Spätantike und Moderne: Zur Neukonzeption des Museums für Islamische Kunst im Pergamonmuseum. In: Jahrbuch Preußischer Kulturbesitz, Band XLVIII (2014), S. 226–257.
 Stefan Weber: Über uns und die anderen: Museen und kulturelle Bildung in der Islamdebatte. In: Jahrbuch Preußischer Kulturbesitz XLIX (2015), S. 88–109.
 Stefan Weber: Jeder kann Aleppo lieben. In: National Geographic, November (2016), S. 28–32 (Syrian Heritage Archive Project)
 Stefan Weber: Kampf um und gegen Kulturgüter im Nahen Osten – Das Fallbeispiel Syrien. In: BMVg.de: Der Reader Sicherheitspolitik, August (2016), S. 1–12 (Syrian Heritage Archive Project)
 Stefan Weber: Multaka: museum as meeting point. Refugees as guides in Berlin museums / Multaka: il museo come punto di incontro. I rifugiati come guide nei musei berlinesi. In: Archaeology & ME, Looking at archaeology in contemmpory Europe / Pensare l'archeologia nell'Europa contemporana. Bologna (2016), S. 142–45.

References

External links 
 Museum für Islamische Kunst (Staatliche Museen zu Berlin)
 
 Museum für Islamische Kunst bei Discover Islamic Art
 Freunde des Museums für Islamische Kunst im Pergamonmuseum e.V.

Islam in Germany
Islamic museums
Museum Island
Islamic Art
Berlin State Museums
Archaeological museums in Germany
1904 establishments in Germany